Magnolia Public Schools is an American nonprofit organization running 13 public charter schools in California, United States. They focus on STEM which is Science, Technology, Engineering and Math because these subjects are believed to be in high demand for future careers. The students are offered various electives such as Robotics Club, Chess Tournaments, Math Tournaments etc. to enrich their studies. MPS's demographics consist of primarily low income and minority students from kindergarten to 12th grade. Two of their schools are statewide benefit charter schools.

References

External links
Official website
STEM Career - For Those Seeking and Promoting STEM Careers

Non-profit organizations based in California